Black Diamond/Flying R Ranch Aerodrome  is located  south southeast of Black Diamond, Alberta, Canada.

References

Registered aerodromes in Alberta
Foothills County